Robert Ussher (1592–1642) was an Irish Protestant Provost of Trinity College Dublin and Bishop of Kildare.

Life
The youngest son of Henry Ussher, Archbishop of Armagh and his first wife Margaret Eliot, daughter of Thomas Elliott of Balreask, he was educated at Trinity College Dublin, being made fellow in 1611, and graduating B.A. 1612, M.A. 1614, vice provost 1615; B.D. 1621. He was prebendary of St. Audoen'sChurch, Dublin (1617); rector of Ardstraw (1617); prebendary of Dromaragh (1624); and rector of Lurgan (1629).

On the death in 1627 of Sir William Temple, there was a disputed election to the Provostship. The senior Fellows elected Joseph Mead, who declined; the junior Fellows elected Ussher (14 April 1627), and he was sworn in the same day. He was set aside by royal letter in favour of William Bedell, who was sworn in on 16 August. On Bedell's promotion as Bishop of Kilmore, Ussher was again elected (3 October 1629), and sworn on 13 January 1630. He owed his appointment to a temperate letter in his favour by his cousin, James Ussher, to whom an appeal had been made.

He was an able preacher, he promoted the study of the Irish language, and he defended the charter rights of the college; but was considered too dovish by the formidable Thomas Wentworth, 1st Earl of Strafford. On 11 August 1634 he resigned the Provostship on being appointed Archdeacon of Meath. On 25 February 1635, he was consecrated Bishop of Kildare. He died at Panta Birsley, near Ellesmere, Shropshire, on 7 September 1642, and was buried at Dudleston (Doddleston) Chapel, near Oswestry. He married Jane, eldest daughter of Francis Kynaston, of Panta Birsley, and left children. His early death at fifty was thought by many to have been hastened by the troubles of the English Civil War.

References

1592 births
1642 deaths
Anglican bishops of Kildare
Archdeacons of Meath
People from County Kildare
Provosts of Trinity College Dublin
17th-century Irish people